Belar, New South Wales is a bounded rural locality of the Warrumbungle Shire and a civil parish of Gowen County, New South Wales. “Mobla” station near Binnaway is located at the south-east corner of Belar parish near the junction of Greenbah Creek with the Castlereagh River.

Location
Belar parish is bounded by the Castlereagh River to the east and Greenbah Creek to the south, north-west of Binnaway.

History
In 1873 it was recorded: "At Mobla a very neat bridge has been erected over the Greenbah Creek, just above its junction with the Castlereagh".

References

Localities in New South Wales
Geography of New South Wales
Central West (New South Wales)